Eucharidium is a genus of flowering plants in the family Onagraceae. They are used as ornamental plants and are considered to be very hardy. They grow to be, on average, one foot tall.

Onagraceae
Onagraceae genera